Marthe Yolande Ongmahan (born 12 June 1992) is a Cameroonian footballer who plays as a goalkeeper for AWA Yaoundé and the Cameroon women's national team.

Career
Ongmahan plays club football for AWA Yaoundé in Yaoundé, where she won the Cameroonian women's league title in 2017.

Ongmahan was included in Cameroon's squad for the 2018 Africa Women Cup of Nations in Ghana, though she did not appear in the tournament. The team ultimately won the third place play-off 4–2 against Mali, thus qualifying for the 2019 FIFA Women's World Cup in France. Therefore, the following year she was included in Cameroon's squad for the Women's World Cup. She again did not appear in the tournament, which saw Cameroon reach the round of 16 before losing 3–0 to England.

References

External links
 

1992 births
Living people
Cameroonian women's footballers
Cameroon women's international footballers
Women's association football goalkeepers
2019 FIFA Women's World Cup players
20th-century Cameroonian women
21st-century Cameroonian women